Mullan Pass is a mountain pass in the western United States, in the Rocky Mountains of Montana. It sits on the Continental Divide on the border between Powell and Lewis and Clark counties at 5,902 feet (1,799 m) above sea level. Located in the Helena National Forest, the pass is thirteen miles (20 km) west of the city of Helena. 

The Northern Pacific Railway (NP) used the pass for its line from Logan to Garrison via Helena, built in 1883.  This line was the NP's primary freight route and was also used by their secondary passenger train, the Mainstreeter. The NP also built an alternate line over Homestake Pass, which was used by their primary passenger train, the North Coast Limited. The rail line at Mullan Pass is currently operated by Montana Rail Link; it crosses under the pass and the continental divide at  via the  Mullan Tunnel.

The pass was named after Lieutenant John Mullan, the U.S. Army engineer who first crossed the pass on March 22, 1854, and later supervised construction of the Mullan Road, the first road over the pass, in 1860.

Notable events
On September 30, 1911 Mullan Pass was the site of the first aeronautical crossing of the North American Continental Divide.  Aviation pioneer Cromwell Dixon flew from Helena to Blossburg, some 15 miles to the west, over the Mullan Pass then successfully flew back the same day. His achievement earned him $10,000, presented to him by Governor Edwin L. Norris.

On February 2, 1989, the Helena train wreck occurred when, during a significant cold snap, a train crew uncoupled the locomotives from a 48-car train due to mechanical problems.  The air brakes failed on the cars, and the train rolled nine miles back into Helena where, at approximately 5:30 a.m., they collided with a parked work train and caught fire. An explosion later linked to a tank car filled with hydrogen peroxide shook the town, knocked out power, and caused extensive damage in the community, but no deaths.

In mid-July 2009, part of the Mullan Tunnel roof collapsed while it was being enlarged to handle double-stack freight cars. It was reopened to train traffic 28 days later, on August 14, 2009.

Second Mullan Pass

See also
 Lookout Pass
 Lookout Pass Ski and Recreation Area
 Mountain passes in Montana

References

External links
 MRL plans to upgrade the Mullan Tunnel

Landforms of Lewis and Clark County, Montana
Mountain passes of Montana
Northern Pacific Railway
Landforms of Powell County, Montana